Jorge Goldenberg Hachero (b. 1941) is a prolific screenwriter from Argentina.

Jorge Goldenberg was born in San Martín, Buenos Aires, Argentina in 1941.
He studied film direction at the Film Institute of the National University of the Litoral in Santa Fe.
He directed the documentaries Reportaje a un vagón (1963), Oficio (1966), co-directed the documentary Hachero nomás (1966) with Patricio Coll, Hugo Bonomo and Luis Zanger, and co-directed the documentary Regreso a Fortín Olmos (2008) with Patricio Coll.

Goldenberg has written several plays that have been staged in Argentina, other countries of Latin America and Europe, including Relevo 1923, Fifty-fifty, Poniendo la casa en orden, Knepp, Cartas a Moreno, Krinsky, La lista completa and Fotos de Infancias.
He has also taught courses and led workshops on scriptwriting in several countries.

Films

Jorge Goldenberg is credited as writer for:
1966 Hachero nomás (documentary short)
1971 Sebastián y su amigo el artista (TV movie)
1972 La nueva Francia
1975 Los Gauchos judíos
1976 Juan que reía
1976 No toquen a la nena
1977 Dear Comrades
1981 Sentimental (requiem para un amigo) (adaptation of the novel "Los desangelados")
1982 Plata dulce (Fernando Ayala)
1984 Otra esperanza
1984 Pasajeros de una pesadilla
1985 La película del rey (A king and his movie) (Carlos Sorín)
1986 Miss Mary (María Luisa Bemberg)
1986 Sostenido en La menor
1989 Eversmile, New Jersey
1990 La frontera (The Frontier) (Ricardo Larraín, Chile)
1993 De eso no se habla (I Don't Want to Talk About It) (dialogue) (María Luisa Bemberg)
1993 La estrategia del caracol
1994 Águilas no cazan moscas
1995 The Eyes of the Scissors
1996 Ilona llega con la lluvia
1997 El sueño de los héroes (Sergio Renán)
1997 El impostor (The Impostor) (Alejandro Maci)
1998 Enthusiasm
1998 Tinta roja (Red Ink) (Full-length documentary directed by Carmen Guarini)
2001 La Fuga (Eduardo Mignogna)
2001 Otilia Rauda 
2002 Francisca (screenplay)
2002 Tarde en la noche (TV movie)
2002 The Place That Was Paradise
2003 The Southern Cross (Pablo Reyero)
2003 La tarara del chapao (Enrique Navarro, Spain)
2004 Perder es cuestión de método (The Art of Losing) (Sergio Cabrera, Colombia/Spain)
2005 Los nombres de Alicia
2006 Las alas de la vida (full-length documentary, directed by Antoni P. Canet, Spain)
2007 My Mexican Shivah (screenplay, based on the story Morirse está en hebreo by Ilan Stavans)
2008 Regreso a Fortín Olmos (Back to Fortin Olmos) (documentary – special mention at the 2008 Mar del Plata Film Festival)

External links

References

Living people
1941 births
Argentine Jews
Argentine screenwriters
Jewish Argentine writers
Male screenwriters
Argentine male writers